Emrys Jones may refer to:

 Emrys Jones (actor) (1915–1972), English actor
 Emrys Jones (literary scholar) (1931–2012), English academic
 Emrys Jones (geographer) (1920–2006), geographer and urban planner
 Emrys Jones (drama professor) (1905–1973), professor of drama who had worked aboard vessels in Canada's north, in his youth